Juan María de la Fuente (born 15 August 1976 in Buenos Aires) is a sailor from Argentina who won a bronze medal at the 2000 Summer Olympics in Sydney, alongside Javier Conte. At the 2012 Summer Olympics in London he also won a bronze medal alongside Lucas Calabrese.

References

External links
 
 
 

1976 births
Living people
Argentine male sailors (sport)
Olympic sailors of Argentina
Olympic bronze medalists for Argentina
Olympic medalists in sailing
Sailors at the 2000 Summer Olympics – 470
Sailors at the 2004 Summer Olympics – 470
Sailors at the 2008 Summer Olympics – 470
Sailors at the 2012 Summer Olympics – 470
Sailors at the 2016 Summer Olympics – 470
Medalists at the 2000 Summer Olympics
Medalists at the 2012 Summer Olympics
Cadet class world champions
Sportspeople from Buenos Aires
Place of birth missing (living people)